DC 100 Page Super Spectacular was an American comic book series published by DC Comics from 1971 through 1973, featuring only reprints initially and later including new stories. The "100 Page" count included both sides of the front and back covers as pages. Each numbered issue appearing under this title featured a wrap-around cover with all editorial content and no advertisements. Versions after late 1973 included advertisements.

Publication history 
The DC 100 Page Super Spectacular series was the "next wave" of "Giant" comics featuring reprint stories in the company's vast trove of tales during a 1971 editorial transition at DC Comics, when the Superman titles were taken over by Julius Schwartz after the retirement of Mort Weisinger, who had overseen all Superman-related comics since the early 1950s. The first DC Giant was the "80 Page Giant", which ran as an annual and then alternately as its own title and as part of regular, ongoing titles throughout the 1960s. Comics prices increased quickly in the early part of the 1970s. As page count dropped to accommodate the 25¢ price, the 80 Page Giant became simply "Giant" comics and DC then quickly switched to a monthly 52-page format at the 25¢ price point and DC 100 Page Super Spectacular series became the standard for "Giant" comics.

Editorial 
This comic series is one of E. Nelson Bridwell's contributions to DC's history and its growing array of characters. As DC acquired the rights to Quality Comics characters, Fawcett Comics characters, and other folded comics companies' characters, a quick way to secure their rights was by publishing reprints featuring these characters. DC characters such as Johnny Quick made reappearances in these reprints and sometimes gained some popularity among readers. These were stand-alone stories, all written to capture any first-time reader when they were originally published, so the reader needed no real introduction to many of these characters. There were brief synopses provided on the inside cover, identifying and giving background to the characters shown on the wraparound cover and a table of contents that provided any information one would need on Golden Age characters that had not been seen in a while. Johnny Quick makes the first of what will turn out to be numerous appearances in many of the 100 Pagers. Quality Comics characters such as Max Mercury (known in the Golden Age as "Quicksilver", and named such on the wraparound cover of DC-11), the Black Condor, the Ray and Doll Man made their first DC Comics appearances in these books.

Collectibility 
While the books languished in relative obscurity in the collector's market for the first 20-odd years of their existence, their Overstreet Comic Book Price Guide estimated value from 1973–1995 did not exceed $3.00, these comic books - particularly the first three issues - have become some of the most sought-after Bronze Age books. Their Overstreet Comic Book Price Guide estimated value has increased from approximately $45.00 to hundreds of dollars each in the 1997-2006 editions. The first three issues were published in relatively small numbers and were entirely editorial content. DC-5, which was a romance comic and, therefore, published in very small numbers, has been heralded as the "rarest of all Bronze Age books" by the Overstreet Comic Book Price Guide. The first issue to feature super-heroes was DC-6 which had a wraparound cover by Neal Adams featuring the Justice League of America and Justice Society of America. This issue also listed every comic book character that DC owned in all of the spaces that otherwise would have been occupied by house ads. For the remainder of the series, super-heroes would dominate the title.

Numbering 
The series is numbered oddly.  There were no issues 1, 2, or 3.  The first three issues published (4, 5, and 6) had subtitles — the first two of which were later used for ongoing comics series. The title ran as a part of regular, ongoing series titles for seven issues with the prefix "DC" added to the numbering (DC-7 through DC-13) in addition to the masthead title's own numbering (e.g., Superman #245 was also DC-7). It reverted to its own title again (DC-14 through DC-22) utilizing as cover titles the existing titles of regular, ongoing series, but not being part of those regular series' numbering. A planned "DC-23" was mentioned in the letters column of DC-22 by editor E. Nelson Bridwell, but it became Shazam! #8 and the Super Spectacular's own numbering disappeared, while advertisements were added. The "DC 100 Page Super Spectacular" title itself was used on another 96 issues of varying regular, ongoing titles through 1975. It began to become a regular version of selected ongoing titles for about a year and then increased its cost to 60¢ with the publishing date of April–May 1974 and continued this pricing until its end. The last 100-Page Super Spectaculars were published with a cover date of March–April 1975.

The issues

Other comics in the Super Spectacular format 
Issues of on-going series which used the 100 Page Super Spectacular format include:

 Action Comics #437 (July 1974), 443 (January 1975) 
 Batman #254–261 (January–February 1974 – March–April 1975)
 The Brave and the Bold #112–117 (April–May 1974 – February–March 1975)
 Detective Comics #438–445 (December 1973–January 1974 – February–March 1975)
 The Flash #229 (September–October 1974), 232 (March–April 1975)
 House of Mystery #224–229 (April–May 1974 – February–March 1975)
 Justice League of America #110–116 (March–April 1974 – March–April 1975) 
 Our Army at War #269 (June 1974), 275 (December 1974)
 Shazam! #8 (December 1973), 12–17 (May–June 1974 – March–April 1975)
 Superboy #202 (June 1974), 205 (December 1974)
 Superman #272 (February 1974), 278 (August 1974), 284 (February 1975)
 The Superman Family #164–169 (April–May 1974 – February–March 1975)
 Tarzan #230–235 (April–May 1974 – February–March 1975)
 The Unexpected #157–162 (May–June 1974 – March–April 1975)
 The Witching Hour #38 (January 1974)
 Wonder Woman #211 (April–May 1974), 214 (October–November 1974)
 World's Finest Comics #223–228 (May–June 1974 – March 1975)
 Young Love #107–114 (December 1973–January 1974 – February–March 1975)
 Young Romance #197–204 (January–February 1974 – March–April 1975)

Revival: DC 100-Page Comic Giant 
In 2018, DC revived the 100-page format, featuring several concurrently running titles focusing on various DC characters, as well as a handful of one-shot issues. Monthly titles often feature between four and six separate serialized stories, reprinting previous material and providing new stories. One-shots may feature as many as nine stories, though they may all be reprinted material.

The revival titles were initially a Wal-Mart exclusive, which ended in October 2019. Certain issues still continue to have location exclusive covers. Titles include:
 Aquaman (Oct. 2019-)
 Batman Vol. 1 #1-14 (June 2018 - Aug. 2019)
 Batman Vol. 2 (Oct. 2019-)
 Crisis on Infinite Earths (Jan. 2020)
 The Flash Vol. 1 #1-7 (Feb. 2019 - Aug. 2019)
 The Flash Vol. 2 (Oct. 2019-)
 From Beyond the Unknown (March 2020-)
 Justice League of America #1-7 (July 2018-Jan. 2019)
 Super Hero Girls (Nov. 2019-)
 Superman Vol. 1 #1-16 (June 2018-Oct. 2019)
 Superman Vol. 2 (Jan. 2020-)
 Swamp Thing Vol. 1 #1-7 (Feb. 2018 - Aug. 2018)
 Swamp Thing Vol. 2 (Oct. 2019-)
 Teen Titans #1-7 (July 2018 - Jan. 2019)
 Titans #1-7 (Feb. 2019 - Aug. 2019)
 Wonder Woman Vol. 1 #1-7 (Feb. 2019 - Aug. 2019)
 Wonder Woman Vol. 2 (Oct. 2019-)
 Batman The Caped Crusader (one-shot) (Jan. 2020)
 Batwoman/Supergirl Worlds Finest (one-shot) (Dec. 2019)
 Birds of Prey (one-shot) (Jan. 2020)
 Ghosts (one-shot) (Oct. 2019)
 Halloween Horror (one-shot) (Oct. 2018)
 Worlds Greatest Super Heroes Holiday Special (one-shot) (Nov. 2018)
 Primal Age (one-shot) (Jan. 2019)
 Scooby-Doo (one-shot) (Sept. 2019)
 Teen Titans Go! (one-shot) (Nov. 2019)
 Villains (one-shot) (Oct. 2019)

References

External links 

 DC 100-Page Super Spectacular at Mike's Amazing World of DC Comics
 

1971 comics debuts
1973 comics endings
Comics anthologies
Defunct American comics
Romance comics
Superhero comics
War comics